Finch Building may refer to:

Finch, Vanslyck and McConville Dry Goods Company Building, St. Paul, Minnesota, listed on the National Register of Historic Places (NRHP)
Finch Building (Scranton, Pennsylvania), listed on the NRHP in Lackawanna County, Pennsylvania
Finch Building (Aberdeen, Washington), formerly listed on the NRHP in Grays Harbor County, Washington
John A. Finch Memorial Nurses Home, Spokane, Washington, also known as Finch Hall, NRHP-listed

See also
Finch House (disambiguation)